This is a list of awards and nominations received by South Korean boy band Enhypen, since their debut in 2020.

Awards and nominations

Notes

References

Enhypen